Diaphanoidea is a taxonomic superfamily of small sea snails, marine opisthobranch gastropod mollusks or micromollusks in the Cephalaspidea, the headshield slugs and bubble snails.

Species in this superfamily have small, flimsy, almost globular shells, known as paper bubble gastropod shells.

This superfamily is not monophyletic.

Distribution
Species in this superfamily are found in cold seas, such as the Arctic region, Antarctica, Australia, and New Zealand.

Habitat
The species occur in the sublittoral to abyssal zones.

Shell description
The shell is minute, thin, fragile, colorless to translucent, and usually less than 5 mm in size. The overall shape is ovate, pear-shaped, and bulbous. There is a sunken apex.

Families
Families in the superfamily Diaphanoidea include:
 Colinatydidae Oskars, Bouchet, and Malaquias, 2015
 Cylichnidae H. Adams & A. Adams, 1854
 Diaphanidae Odhner, 1922
 Mnestiidae Oskars, Bouchet, and Malaquias, 2015
 Notodiaphanidae Thiele, 1931 (taxon inquirendum)

References

External links 

 Photo of Colpodaspis thompsoni

Euopisthobranchia